Johan Vincent Galtung (born 24 October 1930) is a Norwegian sociologist who is the principal founder of the discipline of peace and conflict studies. He was the main founder of the Peace Research Institute Oslo (PRIO) in 1959 and served as its first director until 1970. He also established the Journal of Peace Research in 1964. 

In 1969, he was appointed to the world's first chair in peace and conflict studies, at the University of Oslo. He resigned his Oslo professorship in 1977 and has since held professorships at several other universities; from 1993 to 2000 he taught as Distinguished Professor of Peace Studies at the University of Hawaii. He was the Tun Mahathir Professor of Global Peace at the International Islamic University Malaysia until 2015.

Background

Galtung was born in Oslo. He earned the cand. real. degree in mathematics  at the University of Oslo in 1956, and a year later completed the mag. art. (PhD) degree in sociology at the same university. Galtung received the first of thirteen honorary doctorates in 1975.

Galtung's father and paternal grandfather were both physicians. The Galtung name has its origins in Hordaland, where his paternal grandfather was born. Nevertheless, his mother, Helga Holmboe, was born in central Norway, in Trøndelag, while his father was born in Østfold, in the south. Galtung has been married twice, and has two children by his first wife Ingrid Eide, Harald Galtung and Andreas Galtung, and two by his second wife Fumiko Nishimura, Irene Galtung and Fredrik Galtung.

Galtung experienced World War II in German-occupied Norway, and as a 12-year-old saw his father arrested by the Nazis. By 1951, he was already a committed peace mediator, and elected to do 18 months of social service in place of his obligatory military service. After 12 months, Galtung insisted that the remainder of his social service be spent in activities relevant to peace.

Career
Upon receiving his mag. art. degree, Galtung moved to Columbia University, in New York City, where he taught for five semesters as an assistant professor in the Department of Sociology. In 1959, Galtung returned to Oslo, where he founded the Peace Research Institute Oslo (PRIO). He was the institute's director until 1969.

In 1964, Galtung led PRIO to establish the first academic journal devoted to Peace Studies: the Journal of Peace Research. In the same year, he assisted in the founding of the International Peace Research Association. In 1969, he left PRIO for a position as professor of peace and conflict research at the University of Oslo, a position he held until 1978.

He was the director general of the International University Centre in Dubrovnik and helped to found and lead the World Future Studies Federation. He has held visiting positions at other universities, including Santiago, Chile, the United Nations University in Geneva, and at Columbia, Princeton and the University of Hawaii. In 2014, he was appointed as the first Tun Mahathir Professor of Global Peace at the International Islamic University Malaysia.

Economist and fellow peace researcher Kenneth Boulding has said of Galtung that his "output is so large and so varied that it is hard to believe that it comes from a human". He is a member of the Norwegian Academy of Science and Letters.

In 1993, he co-founded TRANSCEND: A Peace Development Environment Network. In 1987, he was given the Right Livelihood Award.

Peacebuilding 
Galtung first conceptualized peacebuilding by calling for systems that would create sustainable peace. The peacebuilding structures needed to address the root causes of conflict and support local capacity for peace management and conflict resolution. Galtung has held several significant positions in international research councils and has been an advisor to several international organisations. Since 2004, he has been a member of the Advisory Council of the Committee for a Democratic UN.

Galtung is strongly associated with the following concepts:
 Structural violence – widely defined as the systematic ways in which a regime prevents individuals from achieving their full potential. Institutionalized racism and sexism are examples of this.
 Negative vs. positive peace – popularized the concept that peace may be more than just the absence of overt violent conflict (negative peace), and will likely include a range of relationships up to a state where nations (or any groupings in conflict) might have collaborative and supportive relationships (positive peace). Though he did not cite them, these terms were, in fact, previously defined and discussed in a series of lectures starting in 1899 by Jane Addams (in her 1907 book she switched to calling it 'newer ideals of peace' but continued to contrast them to the term negative peace), and in 1963 in the letter from a Birmingham jail by Martin Luther King Jr.

Criticism of the United States
In 1973, Galtung criticised the "structural fascism" of the US and other Western countries that make war to secure materials and markets, stating: "Such an economic system is called capitalism, and when it's spread in this way to other countries it's called imperialism", and praised Fidel Castro's Cuba in 1972 for "break[ing] free of imperialism's iron grip". Galtung has stated that the US is a "killer country" guilty of "neo-fascist state terrorism" and compared the US to Nazi Germany for bombing Kosovo during the 1999 NATO bombing of Yugoslavia.

In an article published in 2004, Galtung predicted that the US empire will "decline and fall" by 2020. He expanded on this hypothesis in his 2009 book titled The Fall of the US Empire - and Then What? Successors, Regionalization or Globalization? US Fascism or US Blossoming?.

Views on Communist regimes 
During his career, Galtung statements and views have drawn criticism including his criticism of Western countries during and after the Cold War and what his critics perceived as a positive attitude to the Soviet Union, Cuba and Communist China. A 2007 article by Bruce Bawer published by the City Journal magazine and a subsequent article in February 2009 by Barbara Kay in the National Post criticised Galtung's opinion of China during the rule of Mao Zedong. China, according to Galtung, was "repressive in a certain liberal sense", but he insisted "the whole theory about what an 'open society' is must be rewritten, probably also the theory of 'democracy'—and it will take a long time before the West will be willing to view China as a master teacher in such subjects." Calling Galtung a "lifelong enemy of freedom", Bawer said Galtung discouraged Hungarian resistance against the Soviet invasion in 1956, and criticized his description in 1974 of Aleksandr Solzhenitsyn and Andrei Sakharov as "persecuted elite personages".

Views on Jews and Israel 
Galtung has recommended that people should read The Protocols of the Elders of Zion, a fabricated antisemitic text purporting to describe a Jewish plan for global domination. In defending his claims that Jews control American media companies, Galtung cited an article published by National Vanguard, a neo-Nazi organization. Galtung's rhetoric has been criticized by Terje Emberland, a historian at the Center for Studies of the Holocaust and Religious Minorities in Oslo, and Øystein Sørensen, a University of Oslo historian known for his scholarship on conspiracy theories. Asked by NRK about his controversial remarks, Galtung reiterated his recommendation that people should read The Protocols of the Elders of Zion. Galtung rejects that he is anti-Semitic.

The Israeli newspaper Haaretz accused Galtung in May 2012 of antisemitism for (1) suggesting the possibility of a link between the 2011 Norway attacks and Israel's intelligence agency Mossad; (2) maintaining that "six Jewish companies" control 96% of world media; (3) identifying what he contends are ironic similarities between the banking firm Goldman Sachs and the conspiratorial antisemitic forgery The Protocols of the Elders of Zion; and (4) theorizing, although not justified, antisemitism in post–World War I Germany was a predictable consequence of German Jews holding influential positions. As a result of such statements, TRANSCEND International, an organisation co-founded by Galtung, released a statement in May 2012 attempting to clarify his opinions. On August 8, 2012, the World Peace Academy in Basel, Switzerland announced it was suspending Galtung from its organization, citing what it posited were his "reckless and offensive statements to questions that are specifically sensitive for Jews."
Galtung said the claims were "smearing and libel",

Selected awards and recognitions
Dr honoris causa, University of Tampere, 1975, peace studies
Dr honoris causa, University of Cluj, 1976, future studies
Dr honoris causa, Uppsala University, 1987, Faculty of Social Sciences
Dr honoris causa, Soka University, Tokyo, 1990, peace/buddhism
Dr honoris causa, University of Osnabrück, 1995, peace studies
Dr honoris causa, University of Torino, 1998, sociology of law
Dr honoris causa, FernUniversität Hagen, 2000, philosophy
Dr honoris causa, University of Alicante, 2002, sociology
Dr honoris causa, Benemérita Universidad Autónoma de Puebla, 2006, law
Dr honoris causa, Complutense University, Madrid, 2017, politics and sociology
Honorary Professor, University of Alicante, Alicante, 1981
Honorary Professor, Free University of Berlin, 1984–1993
Honorary Professor, Sichuan University, Chengdu, 1986
Honorary Professor, Witten/Herdecke University, Witten, 1993
Distinguished Professor of Peace Studies, University of Hawaii, 1993-
John Perkins University Distinguished Visiting Professor, 2005-
Right Livelihood Award, 1987
First recipient of the Humanist Prize of the Norwegian Humanist Association, 1988
Jamnalal Bajaj International Award for Promoting Gandhian Values, 1993
Brage Prize, 2000
First Morton Deutsch Conflict Resolution Award, 2001
Honorary Prize of the Norwegian Sociological Association, 2001
Premio Hidalgo, Madrid, 2005
Augsburg Golden Book of Peace, 2006
Member of the Norwegian Academy of Science and Letters
Honorary member of the Green Party, 2009
Erik Bye Memorial Prize, 2011

Selected works
Galtung has published more than a thousand articles and over a hundred books.

 Statistisk hypotesepröving (Statistical hypothesis testing, 1953)
 Gandhis politiske etikk (Gandhi's political ethics, 1955, with philosopher Arne Næss)
 Theory and Methods of Social Research (1967)
 Violence, Peace and Peace Research (1969)
 Members of Two Worlds (1971)
 Fred, vold og imperialisme (Peace, violence  and  imperialism, 1974)
 Peace: Research – Education – Action (1975)
 Europe in the Making (1989)
 Global Glasnost: Toward a New World Information and Communication Order? (1992, with Richard C. Vincent)
 Global Projections of Deep-Rooted U.S Pathologies  (1996) 
 Peace By Peaceful Means: Peace and Conflict, Development and Civilization (1996)
 Johan uten land. På fredsveien gjennom verden (Johan without land. On the Peace Path Through the World, 2000, autobiography for which he won the Brage Prize)
 50 Years: 100 Peace and Conflict Perspectives (2008)
 Democracy – Peace – Development (2008, with Paul D. Scott)
 50 Years: 25 Intellectual Landscapes Explored (2008)
 Globalizing God: Religion, Spirituality and Peace (2008, with Graeme MacQueen)

References

Sources
 Boulding, Elise. 1982. "Review: Social Science—For What?: Festschrift for Johan Galtung." Contemporary Sociology. 11(3):323-324. JSTOR Stable URL
 Boulding, Kenneth E. 1977. "Twelve Friendly Quarrels with Johan Galtung." Journal of Peace Research. 14(1):75-86. JSTOR Stable URL

External links

 TRANSCEND: A Peace Development Environment Network
 Galtung-Institute for Peace Theory and Peace Practice
 Peace Research Institute Oslo (PRIO)
 Biography on Right Livelihood Award
 Lecture transcript and video of Galtung's speech at the Joan B. Kroc Institute for Peace & Justice at the University of San Diego, December 2010
 Audio recordings with Johan Galtung in the Online Archive of the Österreichische Mediathek (Interviews and lectures in German). Retrieved 18 September 2019

1930 births
Living people
Peace and conflict scholars
Norwegian male writers
Norwegian sociologists
Norwegian mathematicians
Nonviolence advocates
Writers from Oslo
European pacifists
Norwegian political scientists
Members of the Norwegian Academy of Science and Letters
Norwegian expatriates in the United States
Norwegian expatriates in France
Norwegian expatriates in Japan
Norwegian expatriates in Malaysia